William Askew Autry (January 2, 1885 – January 16, 1976) was a utility first baseman/outfielder in Major League Baseball who played in  and  for the Cincinnati Reds (1907) and Boston Doves (1909). Listed at  5' 11", 168 lb., Autry batted and threw left-handed. He was born in Humboldt, Tennessee.

In a two-season career, Autry was a .195 hitter (50-for-257) with 22 runs and 17 RBI in 81 games, including six doubles and six stolen bases. He did not hit a home run.

At first base, Autry posted a .989 fielding percentage with just eight errors in 701 chances. He made 12 outfield appearances at left (8) and center (4), committing one error in 31 chances for a collective .968 F%.

Autry died in Santa Rosa, California at age 91.

Sources

1885 births
1976 deaths
Boston Doves players
Cincinnati Reds players
Major League Baseball first basemen
Major League Baseball outfielders
Baseball players from Tennessee
People from Humboldt, Tennessee
Webb City Goldbugs players
Omaha Rourkes players
Lynn Shoemakers players
St. Paul Saints (AA) players
St. Paul Apostles players
Minneapolis Millers (baseball) players
San Francisco Seals (baseball) players
Oakland Oaks (baseball) players